The Hasselbrack, at , is the highest point in the state of Hamburg, Germany.

It is located on the southern border of the city state with Lower Saxony in the "Black Hills" (Schwarze Berge), a northern outlier of the Harburg Hills in the quarter of Neugraben-Fischbek. It lies within the Rosengarten State Forest close to the Daerstorf Heath (Daerstorfer Heide)  between the settlement of Waldfrieden in the north (which belongs to Fischbek), Neu Wulmstorf-Tempelberg in the west and Rosengarten-Alvesen in the east.
On the "summit" of the Hasselbrack there is a trigonometric point, that is located in the wood just a few metres from the footpath and which marks the highest point. On 16 July 2011 a wooden summit cross was erected here, replaced in 2013 by a summit obelisk .

References 

Harburg, Hamburg
Hills of Hamburg